Machekha is a rural locality (a selo) and the administrative center of Macheshanskoye Rural Settlement, Kikvidzensky District, Volgograd Oblast, Russia. The population was 2,475 as of 2010. There are 16 streets.

Geography 
Machekha is located 21 km northeast of Preobrazhenskaya (the district's administrative centre) by road. Ozerki is the nearest rural locality.

References 

Rural localities in Kikvidzensky District